Pirates on the Mälaren is a 1959 Swedish drama film directed by Per G. Holmgren and starring Carl-Åke Eriksson, Gunnar Björnstrand and Åke Grönberg. It is a remake of the 1923 silent film of the same title in which a group of boys go sailing on the Mälaren, a large lake near Stockholm.

Cast
 Gunnar Björnstrand as Greven
 Christina Lundquist as Karin
 Åke Grönberg as Frasse Flinta
 Tomas Bolme as Erik
 Christian Bratt as Karin's Friend
 Carl-Åke Eriksson as Georg
 Siegfried Fischer as Engman
 Sven-Eric Gamble as Johan
 Elof Ahrle as Truck Driver
 Marianne Karlbeck as Leontine Schalén
 Jan Malmsjö as Max
 Monica Nielsen as Eva
 Gunnar Olsson as Karl Scholke
 Svenerik Perzon as Fabian
 Sif Ruud as 	Kristin
 Hans Strååt as 	Konrad Schalén
 Ilse-Nore Tromm as Mrs. Scholke

References

External links
 

1959 films
1959 drama films
Swedish drama films
1950s Swedish-language films
Films directed by Per G. Holmgren
Remakes of Swedish films
1950s Swedish films